Susan Elizabeth Close (born 12 November 1967) is an Australian politician, who is currently the Deputy Premier of South Australia since March 2022. She also holds the ministerial portfolios of Minister for Climate, Environment and Water, Minister for Industry, Innovation and Science and Minister for Defence and Space Industries while as Deputy Premier.

Close is a member of the Australian Labor Party, serving as the deputy leader following the 2018 State election. She was first elected to the South Australian House of Assembly seat of Port Adelaide at the 2012 by-election, and held Cabinet portfolios in the Weatherill Ministry from 2014 to 2018.

Background

Close earned a PhD in political science at Flinders University where she had studied French, Italian and biology as well as politics in her BA. She graduated from Blackwood High School in 1984 in French, German, Modern History, Classics and Biology.

Her parents were academics at Flinders University (father in History, mother in French) and her only sibling, brother Stephen, works in international development and aid. Her parents met at Oxford University and migrated to Australia to work at Flinders University in its early days.

She was active in the environment movement during her university years, including roles with Greenpeace, the Wilderness Society SA and the SA Conservation Council. She participated in the establishment of both the Adelaide Dolphin Sanctuary and International Bird Sanctuary in the Port River estuary.

She worked as a public servant from 2003 to 2011, largely in the Department for Environment and Heritage. She previously was the head of student services at the University of Adelaide.

Close has two children with her partner Declan.

Parliament
Close retained the South Australian House of Assembly seat of Port Adelaide for Labor at the 2012 by-election with a 42.3 per cent primary and a 52.9 per cent two-candidate-preferred vote. The by-election was held after the resignation of the previous Labor incumbent Kevin Foley. She was re-elected with two-party-preferred votes above 60 per cent at the 2014 election and the 2018 election.

Close has chaired two parliamentary committees: Sustainable Farming Practices, and Dogs and Cats as Companion Animals. She has also been a member of two other parliamentary committees: Port Augusta Power Stations, and Aboriginal Lands. She introduced a private members bill for equal marriage in 2013 but was unsuccessful.

Close entered the Weatherill Ministry in March 2014, initially as the Minister for Manufacturing, Innovation and Trade and the Minister for the Public Sector. After Martin Hamilton-Smith joined the cabinet she served as the Minister for Automotive Transformation and the Minister for Manufacturing and Innovation. She was the Minister for Education and Child Development from 2015 to 2018, and the Minister for Higher Education and Skills from 2016 to 2018.

Deputy Labor leadership
After the 2018 election, Peter Malinauskas became Leader of the Opposition and succeeded Jay Weatherill who had resigned as Labor leader, with Close as deputy, following a Labor caucus meeting on 9 April 2018.

Close is the Labor spokesperson for Climate Change, Environment and Water, Higher Education and Industry. She holds adjunct professorships with both Flinders University in the College of Business, Government and Law, and the University of South Australia.

Following her party's victory at the 2022 state election, she was sworn in as Deputy Premier and Minister for Environment and Water on 21 March 2022. She was further sworn in as Minister for Industry, Innovation and Science and Minister for Defence and Space Industries on 24 March 2022, and her Environment and Water portfolio becoming the Minister for Climate, Environment and Water.

References

External links
Parliamentary Profile: SA Labor website

Members of the South Australian House of Assembly
Living people
Flinders University alumni
Australian Labor Party members of the Parliament of South Australia
Labor Left politicians
21st-century Australian politicians
Women members of the South Australian House of Assembly
1967 births
Women deputy opposition leaders
21st-century Australian women politicians